The Bor constituency (No.133) is a Russian legislative constituency in Nizhny Novgorod Oblast. It covers northern Nizhny Novgorod Oblast.

Members elected

Election Results

1993

|-
! colspan=2 style="background-color:#E9E9E9;text-align:left;vertical-align:top;" |Candidate
! style="background-color:#E9E9E9;text-align:left;vertical-align:top;" |Party
! style="background-color:#E9E9E9;text-align:right;" |Votes
! style="background-color:#E9E9E9;text-align:right;" |%
|-
|style="background-color:"|
|align=left|Tatyana Chertoritskaya
|align=left|Independent
|
|26.10%
|-
|style="background-color:"|
|align=left|Gennady Khodyrev
|align=left|Independent
|
|23.90%
|-
|style="background-color:"|
|align=left|Nikolay Kosterin
|align=left|Agrarian Party
|
|15.03%
|-
|style="background-color:#EA3C38"|
|align=left|Sergey Polozkov
|align=left|Civic Union
|
|7.77%
|-
|style="background-color:"|
|align=left|Gennady Komarov
|align=left|Independent
|
|5.42%
|-
|style="background-color:#DBB726"|
|align=left|Mikhail Isakov
|align=left|Democratic Party
|
|2.17%
|-
|style="background-color:#000000"|
|colspan=2 |against all
|
|10.84%
|-
| colspan="5" style="background-color:#E9E9E9;"|
|- style="font-weight:bold"
| colspan="3" style="text-align:left;" | Total
| 
| 100%
|-
| colspan="5" style="background-color:#E9E9E9;"|
|- style="font-weight:bold"
| colspan="4" |Source:
|
|}

1995

|-
! colspan=2 style="background-color:#E9E9E9;text-align:left;vertical-align:top;" |Candidate
! style="background-color:#E9E9E9;text-align:left;vertical-align:top;" |Party
! style="background-color:#E9E9E9;text-align:right;" |Votes
! style="background-color:#E9E9E9;text-align:right;" |%
|-
|style="background-color:"|
|align=left|Gennady Khodyrev
|align=left|Communist Party
|
|27.20%
|-
|style="background-color:"|
|align=left|Tatyana Chertoritskaya (incumbent)
|align=left|Independent
|
|21.48%
|-
|style="background-color:"|
|align=left|Vladimir Sedov
|align=left|Independent
|
|12.46%
|-
|style="background-color:"|
|align=left|Yury Tarasov
|align=left|Independent
|
|11.27%
|-
|style="background-color:"|
|align=left|Dmitry Sochnev
|align=left|Our Home – Russia
|
|3.96%
|-
|style="background-color:"|
|align=left|Viktor Shamov
|align=left|Liberal Democratic Party
|
|2.96%
|-
|style="background-color:"|
|align=left|Nikolay Ivashko
|align=left|Independent
|
|2.62%
|-
|style="background-color:"|
|align=left|Yevgeny Mamontov
|align=left|Independent
|
|2.39%
|-
|style="background-color:"|
|align=left|Granit Virgasov
|align=left|Independent
|
|2.39%
|-
|style="background-color:#3A46CE"|
|align=left|Vladislav Vishnepolsky
|align=left|Democratic Choice of Russia – United Democrats
|
|1.60%
|-
|style="background-color:"|
|align=left|Aleksandr Tolstov
|align=left|Independent
|
|1.57%
|-
|style="background-color:#000000"|
|colspan=2 |against all
|
|7.58%
|-
| colspan="5" style="background-color:#E9E9E9;"|
|- style="font-weight:bold"
| colspan="3" style="text-align:left;" | Total
| 
| 100%
|-
| colspan="5" style="background-color:#E9E9E9;"|
|- style="font-weight:bold"
| colspan="4" |Source:
|
|}

1999

|-
! colspan=2 style="background-color:#E9E9E9;text-align:left;vertical-align:top;" |Candidate
! style="background-color:#E9E9E9;text-align:left;vertical-align:top;" |Party
! style="background-color:#E9E9E9;text-align:right;" |Votes
! style="background-color:#E9E9E9;text-align:right;" |%
|-
|style="background-color:"|
|align=left|Nikolay Kosterin
|align=left|Independent
|
|44.96%
|-
|style="background-color:"|
|align=left|Sergey Voronov
|align=left|Independent
|
|21.90%
|-
|style="background-color:"|
|align=left|Tatyana Chertoritskaya
|align=left|Independent
|
|9.08%
|-
|style="background-color:"|
|align=left|Viktor Shamov
|align=left|Independent
|
|2.89%
|-
|style="background-color:"|
|align=left|Igor Ruzankin
|align=left|Our Home – Russia
|
|2.09%
|-
|style="background-color:#FF4400"|
|align=left|Nikolay Tishkin
|align=left|Andrey Nikolayev and Svyatoslav Fyodorov Bloc
|
|1.63%
|-
|style="background-color:"|
|align=left|Vladimir Isayev
|align=left|Liberal Democratic Party
|
|1.59%
|-
|style="background-color:"|
|align=left|Rustem Sultanov
|align=left|Independent
|
|1.28%
|-
|style="background-color:#FCCA19"|
|align=left|Yury Novokshanov
|align=left|Congress of Russian Communities-Yury Boldyrev Movement
|
|0.69%
|-
|style="background-color:#084284"|
|align=left|Andrey Pilyugin
|align=left|Spiritual Heritage
|
|0.42%
|-
|style="background-color:"|
|align=left|Dmitry Perevaryukha
|align=left|Independent
|
|0.35%
|-
|style="background-color:#000000"|
|colspan=2 |against all
|
|11.26%
|-
| colspan="5" style="background-color:#E9E9E9;"|
|- style="font-weight:bold"
| colspan="3" style="text-align:left;" | Total
| 
| 100%
|-
| colspan="5" style="background-color:#E9E9E9;"|
|- style="font-weight:bold"
| colspan="4" |Source:
|
|}

2003

|-
! colspan=2 style="background-color:#E9E9E9;text-align:left;vertical-align:top;" |Candidate
! style="background-color:#E9E9E9;text-align:left;vertical-align:top;" |Party
! style="background-color:#E9E9E9;text-align:right;" |Votes
! style="background-color:#E9E9E9;text-align:right;" |%
|-
|style="background-color:"|
|align=left|Aleksandr Khinshtein
|align=left|Independent
|
|38.79%
|-
|style="background-color:"|
|align=left|Nikolay Kosterin (incumbent)
|align=left|Agrarian Party
|
|19.22%
|-
|style="background-color:"|
|align=left|Aleksandr Glukhovskoy
|align=left|Independent
|
|10.22%
|-
|style="background-color:"|
|align=left|Eduard Zhitukhin
|align=left|Communist Party
|
|8.58%
|-
|style="background-color:"|
|align=left|Valery Yemelyanov
|align=left|Liberal Democratic Party
|
|4.39%
|-
|style="background-color:"|
|align=left|Aleksandr Kirin
|align=left|Independent
|
|4.12%
|-
|style="background-color:#7C73CC"|
|align=left|Aleksandr Yevdokimov
|align=left|Great Russia – Eurasian Union
|
|1.94%
|-
|style="background-color:#000000"|
|colspan=2 |against all
|
|10.99%
|-
| colspan="5" style="background-color:#E9E9E9;"|
|- style="font-weight:bold"
| colspan="3" style="text-align:left;" | Total
| 
| 100%
|-
| colspan="5" style="background-color:#E9E9E9;"|
|- style="font-weight:bold"
| colspan="4" |Source:
|
|}

2016

|-
! colspan=2 style="background-color:#E9E9E9;text-align:left;vertical-align:top;" |Candidate
! style="background-color:#E9E9E9;text-align:left;vertical-align:top;" |Party
! style="background-color:#E9E9E9;text-align:right;" |Votes
! style="background-color:#E9E9E9;text-align:right;" |%
|-
|style="background-color:"|
|align=left|Artyom Kavinov
|align=left|United Russia
|
|59.49%
|-
|style="background-color:"|
|align=left|Mikhail Sukharev
|align=left|Communist Party
|
|11.18%
|-
|style="background-color:"|
|align=left|Dmitry Chugrin
|align=left|Liberal Democratic Party
|
|10.78%
|-
|style="background:"| 
|align=left|Kirill Lychagin
|align=left|A Just Russia
|
|4.18%
|-
|style="background:"| 
|align=left|Sergey Yudin
|align=left|Communists of Russia
|
|3.20%
|-
|style="background:"| 
|align=left|Aleksey Vetoshkin
|align=left|Yabloko
|
|2.52%
|-
|style="background-color:"|
|align=left|Viktor Shamov
|align=left|Rodina
|
|2.17%
|-
|style="background-color:"|
|align=left|Irina Sevridova
|align=left|Party of Growth
|
|1.93%
|-
|style="background:"| 
|align=left|Roman Zykov
|align=left|Patriots of Russia
|
|1.43%
|-
| colspan="5" style="background-color:#E9E9E9;"|
|- style="font-weight:bold"
| colspan="3" style="text-align:left;" | Total
| 
| 100%
|-
| colspan="5" style="background-color:#E9E9E9;"|
|- style="font-weight:bold"
| colspan="4" |Source:
|
|}

2021

|-
! colspan=2 style="background-color:#E9E9E9;text-align:left;vertical-align:top;" |Candidate
! style="background-color:#E9E9E9;text-align:left;vertical-align:top;" |Party
! style="background-color:#E9E9E9;text-align:right;" |Votes
! style="background-color:#E9E9E9;text-align:right;" |%
|-
|style="background-color: " |
|align=left|Artyom Kavinov (incumbent)
|align=left|United Russia
|129,582
|51.11%
|-
|style="background-color: " |
|align=left|Roman Kabeshev
|align=left|Communist Party
|40,563
|16.00%
|-
|style="background-color: " |
|align=left|Igor Chkalov
|align=left|A Just Russia — For Truth
|22,593
|8.91%
|-
|style="background-color: " |
|align=left|Dmitry Chugrin
|align=left|Liberal Democratic Party
|21,327
|8.41%
|-
|style="background-color: " |
|align=left|Ilya Pokhlebkin
|align=left|Party of Pensioners
|15,969
|6.30%
|-
|style="background-color: " |
|align=left|Artyom Bazhenov
|align=left|Party of Growth
|9,241
|3.64%
|-
|style="background-color: " |
|align=left|Viktor Shamov
|align=left|Rodina
|6,230
|2.46%
|-
| colspan="5" style="background-color:#E9E9E9;"|
|- style="font-weight:bold"
| colspan="3" style="text-align:left;" | Total
| 253,547
| 100%
|-
| colspan="5" style="background-color:#E9E9E9;"|
|- style="font-weight:bold"
| colspan="4" |Source:
|
|}

Notes

References 

Russian legislative constituencies
Politics of Nizhny Novgorod Oblast